Ripley County is a county in the Ozarks of Missouri. At the 2020 census, it had a population of 10,679. The largest city and county seat is Doniphan. The county was officially organized on January 5, 1833, and is named after Brigadier General Eleazer Wheelock Ripley, a soldier who served with distinction in the War of 1812.

The original area included what would later become Oregon, Howell, Shannon and Carter counties. The historic Natchitoches Trail passes through Ripley County. It was a Native American trail to the Southwest that was used by pioneers, including Stephen F. Austin. During the American Civil War, Ripley County was strongly pro-Southern and provided four colonels for the Confederate Army. Several Civil War skirmishes took place in the county. Tourist areas include the Current River and the Mark Twain National Forest.

History
Located deep in the rugged, wooded hills of Southern Missouri, the area remained sparsely settled throughout the 19th century. Although organized in 1833, the county did not assume its present size until 1872.

When Congress created the Territory of Missouri in 1812, what became Ripley County was in New Madrid County. Three years later, Lawrence County was established, which included all of southern Missouri west of the St. Francis River and a portion of northern Arkansas. The seat of justice for Lawrence County was at Davidsonville in present-day Arkansas. In 1818 Wayne County was formed. This massive county included nearly one-fifth of the area in the Missouri Territory, with Greenville becoming the county seat.

In 1833 the General Assembly created Ripley County from part of Wayne County. The county then included present-day Ripley, Carter, Shannon, Oregon, and Howell Counties, with Van Buren as the county seat. Over the next 26 years, Ripley County's boundaries decreased as new counties were formed: Shannon (1841), Oregon, which included today's Oregon and Howell Counties (1845), and Carter (1859). The last boundary change took place in 1872.

Since most of the population lived in the south, voters moved the county seat to the new Doniphan, where a wooden courthouse was built. This building served the county until it was burned by Union troops, along with almost entire town of Doniphan, on September 19, 1864. William Russell, a county official, had earlier removed the county's record books and hid them in a cave south of town. They remained there until they were retrieved by the county clerk two years after the war.

Because of the chaos and destruction brought about by the Civil War, the courthouse was not replaced until 1871. A two-story brick courthouse was then built, using the $10,000 bond passed by the voters. It housed the administrative offices until it was destroyed by an accidental fire in January 1898.

Ripley County's current courthouse was designed by William F. Schrage of Kansas City, and was built by John McDonald Anderson of Emporia, Kansas in 1898–1899. A central tower, later destroyed during a 1929 tornado, dominated the two-story brick structure. Federal relief workers made repairs and renovations of the courthouse during the 1930s. An extensive remodeling project in the 1970s added central heating. The century-old courthouse is now listed on the National Register of Historic Places and celebrated its centennial during the 1999 Labor Day Homecoming Festivities.

Geography

Adjacent counties
Carter County (north)
Butler County (east)
Clay County, Arkansas (southeast)
Randolph County, Arkansas (southwest)
Oregon County (west)

Major highways
 U.S. Route 160
 Route 21
 Route 142

National protected area
Mark Twain National Forest (part)

Demographics

As of the census of 2000, there were 13,509 people, 5,416 households, and 3,845 families residing in the county. The population density was 22 people per square mile (8/km2).  There were 6,392 housing units at an average density of 10 per square mile (4/km2). The racial makeup of the county was 97.17% White, 0.04% Black or African American, 1.33% Native American, 0.22% Asian, 0.01% Pacific Islander, 0.05% from other races, and 1.17% from two or more races. Approximately 0.98% of the population were Hispanic or Latino of any race. The major first ancestries reported in Ripley County were 34.1% American, 14.0% Irish, 11.6% German and 10.7% English.

There were 5,416 households, out of which 30.30% had children under the age of 18 living with them, 57.40% were married couples living together, 9.60% had a female householder with no husband present, and 29.00% were non-families. 25.90% of all households were made up of individuals, and 13.30% had someone living alone who was 65 years of age or older. The average household size was 2.46 and the average family size was 2.95.

In the county, the population was spread out, with 24.80% under the age of 18, 7.90% from 18 to 24, 25.30% from 25 to 44, 24.70% from 45 to 64, and 17.30% who were 65 years of age or older. The median age was 39 years. For every 100 females there were 94.30 males. For every 100 females age 18 and over, there were 93.10 males.

The median income for a household in the county was $27,285, and the median income for a family was $33,101. Males had a median income of $22,056 versus $17,823 for females. The per capita income for the county was $15,251. About 16.90% of families and 22.00% of the population were below the poverty line, including 27.00% of those under age 18 and 20.40% of those age 65 or over.

At the end of 2008, the unemployment rate in Ripley County was 6.4%.

Religion
According to the Association of Religion Data Archives County Membership Report (2000), Ripley County is a part of the Bible Belt with evangelical Protestantism being the majority religion. The most predominant denominations among residents in Ripley County who adhere to a religion are Southern Baptists (34.98%), Churches of Christ (12.20%), and Baptist Missionary Association of America (10.16%).

2020 Census

Politics

Local
The Republican Party mostly controls politics at the local level in Ripley County. Republicans hold over half of the elected positions in the county.

State
All of Ripley County is a part of Missouri's 153rd District and is currently represented by Steve Cookson (R-Poplar Bluff). 

}

All of Ripley County is a part of Missouri's 33rd District in the Missouri Senate and is currently represented by Mike Cunninghma (R-Rogersville).

Federal

Ripley County is included in Missouri's 8th Congressional District and is represented by Jason T. Smith (R-Salem) in the House of Representatives. Smith won a special election on Tuesday, June 4, 2013, to finish out the remaining term of U.S. Representative Jo Ann Emerson (R-Cape Girardeau). Emerson announced her resignation a month after being reelected with over 70 percent of the vote in the district. She resigned to become CEO of the National Rural Electric Cooperative.

Political culture

At the presidential level, Ripley County is fairly independent-leaning; however, like many rural counties, it does have a slight Republican lean. While George W. Bush carried Ripley County by two-to-one margins in 2000 and 2004, Bill Clinton won the county both times in 1992 and 1996. Like most of the rural counties in Missouri, Ripley County favored John McCain over Barack Obama in 2008. Trump won the county by 70% of the vote in 2020. 

Like most rural areas throughout Southeast Missouri, voters in Ripley County generally adhere to socially and culturally conservative principles which tend to influence their Republican leanings. In 2004, Missourians voted on a constitutional amendment to define marriage as the union between a man and a woman—it overwhelmingly passed Ripley County with 89.06 percent of the vote. The initiative passed the state with 71 percent of support from voters as Missouri became the first state to ban same-sex marriage. In 2006, Missourians voted on a constitutional amendment to fund and legalize embryonic stem cell research in the state—it failed in Ripley County with 57.39 percent voting against the measure. The initiative narrowly passed the state with 51 percent of support from voters as Missouri became one of the first states in the nation to approve embryonic stem cell research. Despite Ripley County's longstanding tradition of supporting socially conservative platforms, voters in the county have a penchant for advancing populist causes like increasing the minimum wage. In 2006, Missourians voted on a proposition (Proposition B) to increase the minimum wage in the state to $6.50 an hour—it passed Ripley County with 75.08 percent of the vote. The proposition strongly passed every single county in Missouri with 75.94 percent voting in favor as the minimum wage was increased to $6.50 an hour in the state. During the same election, voters in five other states also strongly approved increases in the minimum wage.

Missouri presidential preference primary (2008)

In the 2008 presidential primary, voters in Ripley County from both political parties supported candidates who finished in second place in the state at large and nationally. Then U.S. Senator Hillary Clinton (D-New York) received her fourth strongest showing in the Democratic Primary of 2008 in Ripley County; she only did better in Dunklin, Wayne and Carter counties. Also, she received more votes, a total of 1,073, than any candidate from either party in Ripley County during the 2008 presidential primary.

Education
Of adults 25 years of age and older in Ripley County, 62.1% possesses a high school diploma or higher while 7.8% holds a bachelor's degree or higher as their highest educational attainment.

Public schools
Current River Area Vocational School – Doniphan – (09-12)
Doniphan R-I School District – Doniphan
Doniphan Elementary School (K-02)
Doniphan Intermediate School (03-05)
Doniphan Middle School (06-08)
Doniphan High School (09-12)
Naylor R-II School District – Naylor
Naylor Elementary School (K-06)
Naylor High School (07-12)
Ripley County (Gatewood) R-III School District – Gatewood – (K-08)
Ripley County (Lone Star) R-IV School District – Doniphan

Private schools
West Point Christian Academy – Doniphan – (K-11) – Assemblies of God/Pentecostal

Public libraries
 Doniphan-Ripley County Library

Communities

Cities
Doniphan (seat)
Naylor

Census-designated places
Fairdealing
Oxly

Other unincorporated places

 Bardley
 Beaverdam
 Briar
 Budapest
 Burr
 Carie
 Current View
 Doyle
 Flatwoods
 Gamburg
 Gatewood
 Glenn
 Handy
 Hemenway
 Leibig
 Owenmont
 Pine
 Poynor
 Pratt
 Pulaski
 Purman
 Sinsabaugh
 Torch

See also
National Register of Historic Places listings in Ripley County, Missouri

References

External links
 Digitized 1930 Plat Book of Ripley County  from University of Missouri Division of Special Collections, Archives, and Rare Books

 
1833 establishments in Missouri
Populated places established in 1833